The Padre Reginaldo Manzotti discography, a Brazilian singer and priest, is composed of eleven studio albums, four live albums, four video albums, two digital singles and an EP digital.

Albums

Studio albums

Live albums

Vídeo albums

Singles

References 

Discographies of Brazilian artists